Berr is a surname. Notable people with the surname include:

Hans Berr (1890-1917), German First World War flying ace
Hélène Berr (1921–1945), Jewish French woman
Henri Berr (1863–1954), French philosopher

See also
Ber (disambiguation)
BERR, Department for Business, Enterprise and Regulatory Reform in United Kingdom